Anna Maria Żukowska (born June 11, 1983) is a Polish politician who in 2019 was elected to the Polish Sejm.

Life
Żukowska was born in Warsaw in 1983. When she was at school she attended the "Author's High School No. 42" (Autorskiego Liceum Ogólnokształcącego 42) in Warsaw, where she was classmates with the film actress Hanna Konarowska and writer and businessperson Sylwia Stano. Her first degree from the University of Warsaw was in English and her master's degree was in law. She was an activist for the Polish Jewish youth organisation "Żydowska Ogólnopolska Organizacja Młodzieżowa" whilst she ran the family business.

Żukowska joined the Democratic Left Alliance and she was elected vice president of the Masovian Voivodeship. In 2016 she was promoted to the office of their party's spokesperson. She unsuccessfully ran for the Council of the City of Warsaw in the 2018 local elections.

In the parliamentary election in 2019 she had 18,864 vote and she was elected a deputy to the Sejm for the 9th term from her party's list in the Warsaw constituency.

Personal life
She has a daughter, which she is raising alone. She is bisexual

References

1983 births
Living people
Politicians from Warsaw
Women members of the Sejm of the Republic of Poland
Members of the Polish Sejm 2019–2023
Polish LGBT politicians
21st-century Polish women politicians
21st-century Polish LGBT people